The following is a discography of Richard X, a British pop music producer. It includes his releases, productions, and remixes.

Girls on Top
Richard X started his career in the underground music scene creating popular bootlegs under the pseudonym Girls on Top.

Singles
 "Being Scrubbed" / "I Wanna Dance with Numbers" (January 2001)
 The Human League's "Being Boiled" vs TLC's "No Scrubs"
 Whitney Houston's "I Wanna Dance With Somebody (Who Loves Me)" vs Kraftwerk's "Numbers" and "Computer World Part 2"
 "Warm Bitch" / "We Don't Give a Damn About Our Friends" (August 2001)
Missy Elliott's "She's a Bitch" vs The Normal's "Warm Leatherette"
Adina Howard's "Freak Like Me" vs Gary Numan/Tubeway Army's "Are 'Friends' Electric?"
Albums
 Greatest Hits (April 2005)
 includes Girls on Top's singles, "Romance V.3" (Aaliyah's "Rock the Boat" vs Orchestral Manoeuvres in the Dark's "The Romance of the Telescope"), "The White Single" (Fat Truckers' "Teenage Daughters" vs The Beatles' "Paperback Writer", and the We Don't Give a Damn Mix of Sugababes' "Freak Like Me"

Richard X
Singles
"Freak Like Me" (vs Sugababes) (#1, April 2002)
"Being Nobody" (vs Liberty X) (#3, March 2003)
"Finest Dreams" (featuring Kelis) (#8, August 2003)
"You Used To" (featuring  Javine) (cancelled)

Albums
Richard X Presents His X-Factor Vol. 1 (#31, August 2003)
Back to Mine Volume 17 (April 2004)

Production discography

2001

Girls on Top
 "Being Scrubbed"
 "I Wanna Dance with Numbers"
 "Warm Bitch"
 "We Don't Give a Damn About Our Friends"
 "Romance V.3"
 "The White Single"

2002

Sugababes - Angels with Dirty Faces
 "Freak Like Me"

2003

Bertine Zetlitz - Sweet Injections
 "Girl Like You"

M*A*R*Y
 "73 Club" (featuring Andrew Robinson)

Tiga
 "Burning Down"

Shame 69
 "No Business"

Richard X Presents His X-Factor Vol. 1
 "Start"
 "Being Nobody" (vs Liberty X)
 "Rock Jacket"
 "You Used To" (featuring Javine)
 "Just Friends" (featuring Annie)
 "IX"
 "Lonely" (featuring Caron Wheeler)
 "Walk On By" (featuring Deborah Evans-Strickland)
 "Lemon/Lime" (featuring Deborah Evans-Strickland)
 "Finest Dreams" (featuring Kelis)
 "You (Better Let Me Love You X4) Tonight" (featuring Tiga)
 "Mark One" (featuring Mark Goodier)
 "Freak Like Me (We Don't Give a Damn Mix)" (vs Sugababes)
 "Into U" (featuring Jarvis Cocker)
 "End"

Liberty X - Being Somebody
 "Being Nobody"

2004

Prince Po - The Slickness
 "Hold Dat"

Rachel Stevens - Funky Dory reissue
 "Some Girls"

Annie - Anniemal
 "Chewing Gum"
 "Me Plus One"

2005

M.I.A. - Arular
 "Amazon"
 "10 Dollar"

Rachel Stevens - Come and Get It
 "Some Girls"
 "Crazy Boys"

2006

Pet Shop Boys - Fundamentalism
 "Fugitive"

Luke Haines
 "Off My Rocker at the Art School Bop"
 "I Am the Best Artist / Skinny White Boys"

Alesha Dixon - Fired Up
 "Nasty" (unreleased)
 "Shadows" (unreleased)
 "Ting-a-ling"

2007

Chungking - Stay Up Forever
 "Itch and Scratch"
 "Slow It Down"

Róisín Murphy - Overpowered
 "Parallel Lives"
Outtakes
 "Pandora" (b-side to "You Know Me Better", and iTunes Bonus Track to Overpowered)

Sam Sparro - Sam Sparro
 "Too Many Questions"
 "Sally"
 "No End in Sight"

2009

Annie - Don't Stop
 "Songs Remind Me of You"
All Night EP
 "I Know UR Girlfriend Hates Me"
 "Anthonio"
Outtakes
 "Two of Hearts"

2010

Sophie Ellis-Bextor - Make a Scene
 "Starlight"
 "Magic"

Steve Mason - Boys Outside
 "All Come Down"

Goldfrapp - Head First
 "Alive"

2011

Innerpartysystem - Never Be Content
 "And Together"
 "Money Makes The World Go Round"
 "American Trash"
 "Out of Touch"
 "Not Getting Any Better"
 "Squid"

Will Young - Echoes
 "Jealousy"
 "Come On"
 "Lie Next To Me"
 "I Just Want A Lover"
 "Runaway"
 "Outsider"
 "Silent Valentine"
 "Losing Myself"
 "Personal Thunder"
 "Hearts On Fire"
 "Happy Now"
 "Good Things"
 "Safe From Harm"

The Sound of Arrows - Voyage
 "Into the Clouds"
 "My Shadow"
 "Magic"
 "Longest Ever Dream"
 "Lost City"

2013

Annie - The A&R EP

2014

Erasure - The Violet Flame

2015

Annie - The Endless Vacation EP

2016

Little Boots - After Hours EP
 "Staring at the Sun"

2019

Bananarama - In Stereo
 "Love in Stereo"

Band of Skulls - Love Is All You Love
 "Carnivorous"
 "That's My Trouble"
 "Love Is All You Love"
 "Not The Kind Of Nothing I Know"
 "Cool Your Battles"
 "Sound Of You"
 "Thanks A Lot"
 "We're Alive"
 "Speed Of Light"
 "Gold"

Will Young - Lexicon
 "All the Songs"
 "My Love"
 "Scars"
 "Get Me Dancing" 
 "Ground Running"
 "Dreaming Big" 
 "I Bet You Call" 
 "Forever"
 "Freedom" 
 "Faithless Love"
 "Say Anything"
 "The Way We Were"

Remixography

2002
 Fat Truckers - "The White Single" (Richard X Remix) (Fat Truckers' "Teenage Daughter" vs The Beatles' "Paperback Writer")
 Sugababes - "Freak Like Me" (Richard X/Girls On Top Remix)

2003
 Richard X vs Liberty X - "Being Nobody" (Richard X Remix)
 Richard X vs Liberty X - "Being Nobody" (Richard X Dancehall Remix featuring Specialist Moss)
 Louie Austen featuring Peaches - "Grab My Shaft" (Richard X Remix)
 Bertine Zetlitz - "Girl Like You" (Richard X And Lucky Music Remix)
 TLC - "Hands Up" (Richard X Remix)
 Tiga - "Hot In Herre" (Richard X presents Gareth Gatex Remix)
 Tiga - "Hot In Herre" (Richard X presents Gareth Gatex Dub)

2004
 Tiga - "Pleasure from the Rave" ("Pleasure from the Bass" remix)
 Depeche Mode - "Enjoy the Silence" (Richard X Remix)
 Freeform Five - "No More Conversations" (Richard X Remix)

2005
 Ciara - "Goodies" (Richard X Remix featuring M.I.A.)
 New Order - "Jetstream" (Richard X Remix)
 Nine Inch Nails - "Only" (Richard X Remix)
 Gwen Stefani - "Cool" (Richard X Remix)
 The Bravery - "Fearless" (Richard X Remix)

2006
 Yazoo - "Situation" (Richard X Remix)
 New Order - "Bizarre Love Triangle" (Richard X Remix)
 Annie - "The Crush" (Richard X Remix)
 Depeche Mode - "Personal Jesus" (Richard X Remix) (unreleased)
 Nine Inch Nails - "Only" (Richard X Remix) from Every Day Is Exactly The Same [EP]

2007
 Nerina Pallot - "Geek Love" (Richard X Remix)

2008
 Soft Cell - "Seedy Films" (Richard X Remix)

2009
 Pet Shop Boys - "The way it used to be" (Richard X Remix)
 Dragonette - "Pick Up the Phone" (Richard X Remix)
 Saint Etienne - Foxbase Beta (whole album remixed by Richard X)

2010
 Goldfrapp - "Rocket" (Richard X Eight Four Remix)
 Goldfrapp - "Rocket" (Richard X One Zero Remix and Radio Edit)
 Goldfrapp - "Rocket" (Richard X One Zero Remix)
 Hot Chip - "I Feel Better" (Richard X Remix)
 Kelis - "4th of July (Fireworks)" (Richard X Remix)

2011
 Patrick Wolf - "The City" (Richard X Remix)
 Mirrors - "Into the Heart" (Richard X Radio Remix)

2012
 Cassie - "King of Hearts" (Richard X Remix)

2013
 Belle and Sebastian - I Didn't See it Coming (Richard X Mix)

2021
 Annie - American Cars (Richard X Edit)

External links

 BlackMelody.com

Discographies of British artists
Pop music discographies
Production discographies